Prorophora is a genus of snout moths described by Émile Louis Ragonot in 1887.

Species
Subgenus Prorophora
Prorophora albidogilvella Roesler, 1970
Prorophora curvibasella Ragonot, 1887
Prorophora dialeuca Hampson, 1912
Prorophora grisealella Marion, 1957
Prorophora kazachstaniella Asselbergs, 2004
Prorophora sacculicornella Roesler, 1970
Subgenus Reisserempista Roesler, 1970
Prorophora binacantha Liu & Li, 2012
Prorophora mongolica Roesler, 1970
Subgenus Aproceratia Amsel, 1950
Prorophora afghanella Roesler, 1973
Prorophora albunculella (Staudinger, 1879)
Prorophora eberti (Amsel, 1959)
Prorophora halothamni Falkovitsh, 1999
Prorophora senganella (Amsel, 1951)

References

Phycitinae
Pyralidae genera
Taxa named by Émile Louis Ragonot